Great Sandy may refer to:

Great Sandy Desert, Western Australia
High Desert (Oregon), United States, called Great Sandy Desert in the 19th century
Great Sandy Island (Western Australia)
Fraser Island, Australia, known for a short period as Great Sandy Island
Great Sandy Strait, Australia